Riotous assembly may refer to:
riot, a form of civil disorder
Riotous Assembly, a novel by Tom Sharpe